Siddharth Chandekar (born 14 June 1991) is an Indian actor. He is known for his work in Marathi cinema. At the age of 19, he made his debut in Marathi cinema with Avadhoot Gupte's 2010 political drama movie Zenda.

Career
 
Siddharth Chandekar is a well-known name in the Marathi industry. Siddharth started his acting career in 2007 with the Hindi film ‘Hamne Jeena Sikh Liya’.  However, Siddharth made his debut in Marathi with the popular TV serial Agnihotra, later he appeared in Avadhoot Gupte's ‘Zenda’. Siddharth is best known for his role Ani in the recent blockbuster film Classmates. In 2014 he starred as a lead in Ajay Naik's Baware Prem He opposite Urmila Kanitkar.

He then appeared in Aditya Sarpotdar's 2015 blockbuster movie Classmates. Siddharth was seen opposite debutant Rutuja Shinde in romantic comedy film Online Binline. He is set to appear in different films like Vazandar co-starring Sai Tamhankar and Priya Bapat to be directed by Sachin Kundalkar, Lost and Found along with Spruha Joshi and Pindadan. Siddharth's next film Lost and Found was released on  29 July. The film produced by Golden Gate Motion Pictures is a love story and has Siddharth Chandekar as the male lead. In 2017 Siddhartha's bus stop movie was released. In 2018, he starred in the film Gulabjamun alongside Sonali Kulkarni which is directed by national award winner director Sachin Kundalkar.

Personal life
Siddharth completed his primary education at S D Katariya High School in his hometown Pune, followed by studies at Sir Parshurambhau College Pune. He uses his mom Seema Chandekar's name as his middle name. He married actress Mitali Mayekar.

Media image 

He was ranked fourth in The Times of India's Top 15 Most Desirable Men on Marathi Television in 2020.

Filmography

Films

Television
 2019 City of Dreams  on Hotstar (Web Series)
 2010 Agnihotra as Neil Agnihotri
 2011 Kashala Udyachi Baat as Aditya Mahashabde
 2011 Madhu Ethe An Chandra Tithe - Zee Marathi as Mohan
 2017 Prem He - Zee Yuva as Shree 
 2019 Jeevlaga - Star Pravah as Nikheel
 2020-21 Sang Tu Aahes Ka? - Star Pravah as Swaraj
 2021 Bigg Boss Marathi 3 - Colors Marathi as Guest
2021 Mulgi Zali Ho - Star Pravah to promote Mi Honar Superstar - Chhote Ustaad

References

External links
 

Indian male film actors
Male actors from Pune
21st-century Indian male actors
Male actors in Marathi cinema
1991 births
Living people
Male actors in Marathi television